Rhynchelytrum is a genus of plants in the grass family. The only known species is Rhynchelytrum reynaudioides, native to Annobón Island in Equatorial Guinea.

See also
List of Poaceae genera

References

Panicoideae
Bunchgrasses of Africa
Flora of Equatorial Guinea
Monotypic Poaceae genera
Taxa named by Charles Edward Hubbard
Taxa named by Christian Gottfried Daniel Nees von Esenbeck